Tyus is an unincorporated community in Carroll County, in the U.S. state of Georgia.

History
A post office called Tyus was established in 1892, and remained in operation until 1905. The community was named after Jackson "Jack" Buchanan Tyus, a local merchant.

References

Unincorporated communities in Georgia (U.S. state)
Unincorporated communities in Carroll County, Georgia